The 2001 FIA Formula One World Championship was the 55th season of FIA Formula One racing. It commenced on 4 March 2001 and ended on 14 October after seventeen races. Michael Schumacher won the Drivers' title with a record margin of 58 points, after achieving nine victories and five-second places and Ferrari won the Constructors' award. The season also marked the reintroduction of several electronic driver aid systems; including traction control, launch control, and fully-automatic transmissions, with the FIA permitting their use starting at the Spanish Grand Prix. Electronic driver aids had previously been banned since . Schumacher also broke the all-time Formula One Grand Prix wins record during the season, his victory at the Belgian Grand Prix marking his 52nd career win.

Future world champions Fernando Alonso and Kimi Räikkönen made their Grand Prix debuts in Melbourne, for Minardi and Sauber respectively. Colombian former CART champion Juan Pablo Montoya also made his F1 debut, with Williams.

There were new beginnings for French companies Renault and Michelin. After three years out of the sport since 1998, Renault returned to supply engines to the Benetton team, while Michelin's comeback as a tyre supplier provided Bridgestone with competition for the first time since Goodyear left the sport at the end of the 1998 season. At the other end of the spectrum fellow French company Peugeot withdrew from the sport after seven years since 1994 following a disastrous season in 2000 as an engine supplier to Prost. The assets of Peugeot's Formula One programme were purchased by Asia Motor Technologies France and the 2000-spec powerplants were rebadged as Asiatechs and supplied to Arrows free of charge.

At the end of the season, double world champion Mika Häkkinen announced his intention to take a one-year sabbatical in 2002; eventually this became full-time retirement. Also racing for the last time in 2001 was Jean Alesi, who passed the 200 race mark shortly before his final Grand Prix in Japan. Veteran British commentator Murray Walker gave his final commentary at the United States Grand Prix (which would also turn out to be Mika Häkkinen's last victory in the sport).

The Prost and Benetton names disappeared from the sport at the end of 2001; Prost folded due to a lack of finances while Benetton was re-branded as Renault after the French manufacturer bought the team outright.

The Drivers' Championship was won with ease by Michael Schumacher, who finished 58 points clear of David Coulthard in second place. It was Schumacher's fourth world championship, equalling Alain Prost's total. With Michael Schumacher's teammate, Rubens Barrichello, tallying 10 podiums throughout the season, Ferrari also won the Constructors' Championship by a substantial margin. Unlike the previous title-winning season, Schumacher was very consistent throughout the campaign and scored his nine wins more spread evenly out through the season. His title was sealed with four races remaining after a commanding win in Hungary. Coulthard's title challenge looked strong early on, winning two of the first six races and being neck and neck with Schumacher for the title lead. He also qualified on pole position in Monaco, only to stall on the grid. With Schumacher winning the race and Coulthard recovering only to fifth, it was a turning point of the season. Coulthard would not win again for the rest of the year and had dropped off massively by mid-season as Schumacher kept either winning or finishing second with few exceptions all season.

Williams drivers Ralf Schumacher and Juan Pablo Montoya both scored their maiden wins in the sport, at San Marino and Italy respectively. The younger Schumacher added victories in Canada and Germany, giving the team four wins in total, marking a return to success for the Oxfordshire team after three years without a victory since 1997. The Schumacher brothers also scored historic family 1–2 finishes in Canada and France.

McLaren secured four wins during the season. These were shared equally among their drivers: Häkkinen winning in Britain and the United States, Coulthard winning in Brazil and Austria.

Teams and drivers

The following teams and drivers competed in the 2001 FIA Formula One World Championship.

† All engines were 3.0 litre, V10 configuration.

Driver changes
 Olivier Panis left his test position with McLaren to take up a full-time drive with BAR. He took the place of Ricardo Zonta, with the Brazilian taking up the position of test driver with Jordan.
 Still on contract to Williams, Jenson Button was loaned to Benetton for the season. Button replaced Alexander Wurz at Benetton, as the Austrian had fallen out of favour with team boss Flavio Briatore and moved on to become a test driver at McLaren. Button's place in the Williams was taken over by Juan Pablo Montoya, who had been tied to Williams since 1998 but had been loaned to the CART series in 1999, where he took the title in his first attempt as well as a victory in the Indianapolis 500.
 Marc Gené lost his seat at Minardi due to sponsorship problems. Gené signed a contract to become a test driver at Williams where he remained until the end of 2004, and was replaced with debutant Fernando Alonso. Gastón Mazzacane also moved away from Minardi for 2001, having been replaced by the returning Tarso Marques.
 Mazzacane beat CART driver Oriol Servià for the Prost seat, replacing Nick Heidfeld – who subsequently left the team and moved to Sauber. Kimi Räikkönen was signed alongside Heidfeld for a full drive from near obscurity. The Finn had performed some testing for Sauber in late 2000 after dominating the British Formula Renault series, and so impressed Peter Sauber that he was given the full-time drive. Pedro Diniz did not return as a driver for Sauber, but instead purchased 40% of the Prost team and served in a management role there in 2001. 
 Johnny Herbert decided to leave the Jaguar team in an attempt to secure a drive in Champ Cars. The deal did not work out, and he was forced to sign on with Arrows as a test driver for 2001. Luciano Burti stepped up from test driver to fill Herbert's slot at Jaguar. 
 Pedro de la Rosa lost his drive at Arrows to Enrique Bernoldi and signed on as a reserve driver with Prost.

Mid-season changes

 Gastón Mazzacane was fired by the Prost team after the San Marino Grand Prix. He was replaced with Jaguar's Luciano Burti, who was subsequently replaced with Prost reserve driver Pedro de la Rosa.
 Heinz-Harald Frentzen suffered injuries after a crash and was replaced for the Canadian GP by reserve driver Ricardo Zonta. After returning from his injuries, Frentzen's contract was terminated by Jordan after the British GP. The split was not a happy one, and the matter ended in court before the season's end. Zonta took over Frentzen's drive for the German GP.
 Jean Alesi quit his Prost drive after the German Grand Prix. Frentzen was then signed to Prost to take over from Alesi, before Jordan completed a straight swap by signing Alesi – with both drivers remaining in their new seats for the rest of the season.
 Alex Yoong was granted his FIA super-licence during the 2001 season and replaced Tarso Marques in the Minardi starting lineup at the Italian Grand Prix. Marques moved into a reserve/test role for the rest of the season.
 Luciano Burti suffered serious injuries during a crash in the Belgian GP. He was forced to sit out the rest of the 2001 season and was replaced by Czech driver Tomáš Enge for the remaining races.

Changes

Rule changes
 The eleven teams and members of Formula One's governing body, the Fédération Internationale de l'Automobile (FIA) held a meeting on 30 August at Heathrow Airport to discuss rule changes for the 2001 season. It was agreed that drivers would be allowed to use an extra three sets of tyres during Friday's two practice sessions. Ten days later at Monza, team bosses accepted to ban in-season testing during the month of August and a three-week break would be implemented during that time period.

Safety car
For this season, Mercedes-Benz provided a new safety car in the shape of the SL55 AMG, which also performed this duty during 2002 and replaced the previous CL55 AMG. It was first deployed during the German Grand Prix.

Season calendar
{|class="wikitable" width=650px style="font-size: 85%;"
|-
! Round
! Grand Prix
! Circuit
! Date
|-
!1
|Australian Grand Prix
| Melbourne Grand Prix Circuit, Melbourne
|4 March
|-
!2
|Malaysian Grand Prix
| Sepang International Circuit, Kuala Lumpur
|18 March
|-
!3
|Brazilian Grand Prix
| Autódromo José Carlos Pace, São Paulo
|1 April
|-
!4
|San Marino Grand Prix
| Autodromo Enzo e Dino Ferrari, Imola
|15 April
|-
!5
|Spanish Grand Prix
| Circuit de Catalunya, Montmeló
|29 April
|-
!6
|Austrian Grand Prix
| A1-Ring, Spielberg
|13 May
|-
!7
|Monaco Grand Prix
| Circuit de Monaco, Monte Carlo
|27 May
|-
!8
|Canadian Grand Prix
| Circuit Gilles Villeneuve, Montreal
|10 June
|-
!9
|European Grand Prix
| Nürburgring, Nürburg
|24 June
|-
!10
|French Grand Prix
| Circuit de Nevers Magny-Cours, Magny-Cours
|1 July
|-
!11
|British Grand Prix
| Silverstone Circuit, Silverstone
|15 July
|-
!12
|German Grand Prix
| Hockenheimring, Hockenheim
|29 July
|-
!13
|Hungarian Grand Prix
| Hungaroring, Mogyoród
|19 August
|-
!14
|Belgian Grand Prix
| Circuit de Spa-Francorchamps, Stavelot
|2 September
|-
!15
|Italian Grand Prix
| Autodromo Nazionale di Monza, Monza
|16 September
|-
!16
|United States Grand Prix
| Indianapolis Motor Speedway, Speedway
|30 September
|-
!17
|Japanese Grand Prix
| Suzuka Circuit, Suzuka
|14 October
|-
| colspan="4" style="background-color:#EAECF0;text-align:center" align="bottom" |Sources:|}

 Report 

Michael Schumacher started the new season where he had left off the year before, with a dominant win from pole position in the first race in Australia. Arch-rival Mika Häkkinen lost second after a suspension failure, giving second to his teammate David Coulthard, with Schumacher's teammate Rubens Barrichello completing the podium. Kimi Räikkönen finished his first F1 race in the points with sixth place.  The race was marred by the death of Graham Beveridge, a track marshal who was hit by debris after a collision between Ralf Schumacher and Jacques Villeneuve.

 
Schumacher and Ferrari teammate Barrichello started 1–2 in Malaysia and maintained their positions at the first corner, but there was a massive rain shower on the second lap, during which both Ferraris went off the track. After everyone pitted to change tyres, the Ferraris were down in 10th and 11th, but they changed to intermediates while all others had changed to wets. This masterstroke meant that the Ferraris were able to charge back up the order and get back first and second. Schumacher won, with Barrichello completing a Ferrari 1–2, and Coulthard was third.

Schumacher was on pole in Brazil, but a collision on the first lap brought out the safety car. As the race restarted, Williams rookie Juan Pablo Montoya shocked Schumacher by coming up the inside of him and taking the lead. Montoya was well set for a stunning maiden win until he got hit from behind by Jos Verstappen while lapping him. It began to rain, and after everyone changed the tyres, Schumacher was leading but then Coulthard passed him on the first turn when they were lapping Tarso Marques in a move reminiscent of the one made by Mika Häkkinen on Schumacher in Belgium last year. Coulthard went on to win, with Schumacher and Nick Heidfeld second and third.

In Ferrari's first 'home' race in San Marino, their chief rivals McLaren stunned them by qualifying 1–2, with Coulthard on pole. Schumacher was fourth behind his brother Ralf Schumacher. Ralf shot to the lead at the start, passing both McLarens before the first corner, and was never headed. Coulthard ran him close, and finished second, with Barrichello jumping Häkkinen in the stops to take third. Michael Schumacher had a miserable afternoon suffering a gearbox glitch early on and then having to retire after a puncture that damaged the wheel rim and a brake duct.

After 4 races, Schumacher and Coulthard were level on the standings with 26 points, Barrichello and Ralf were third with 14 and 12 points respectively. Häkkinen had only 4 and was only seventh in the standings. In the Constructors' Championship, Ferrari led with 40, with McLaren second with 30. Williams was third with 12.

The next round in Spain was the first with the reintroduction of traction control, launch control, and fully automatic gearbox systems, for the first time since 1993. The driving aids were brought back to ensure no teams were cheating but questions were raised over the reliability. Its first victim was David Coulthard who stalled on the grid and had to start from the back. The race was a battle between Schumacher and Häkkinen, with the former winning pole and leading the first two parts of the race. During the second pit stop, Schumacher had a problem and lost a lot of time, giving the lead to Häkkinen, who then stretched it to half a minute, as Schumacher was struggling with a suspension problem. Ironically, it was Häkkinen's car that gave out first, on the last lap with a clutch failure, giving the win to Schumacher. Montoya finished second, and Jacques Villeneuve completed the podium. Coulthard recovered to fifth after his start line problems.
 
The sixth round was in Austria and the two Williams cars out-dragged polesitter Schumacher into the first corner. Ralf retired with a brake problem, and this left Montoya under attack from Schumacher. Schumacher tried to pass, but instead, both went into the gravel and rejoined sixth and seventh. Coulthard took the lead by jumping Rubens Barrichello in the second round of stops, and won, while Barrichello had to yield second to a recovering Schumacher on the final lap.

Round 7 was in Monaco, and Coulthard took pole but stalled on the grid after again suffering problems with the launch control system. This left the two Ferraris and Häkkinen to battle for the win, and when Häkkinen's engine failed early on, the Ferraris cruised to a 1–2 finish, with Schumacher winning ahead of Barrichello. The demise of the McLarens allowed Eddie Irvine to get a podium, while Coulthard recovered to fifth despite spending the majority of the race stuck behind Enrique Bernoldi.

The round in Canada was a battle between the Schumacher brothers, with Michael taking pole and maintaining his lead at the first corner. Ralf, however, kept up with him, and when his brother pitted, upped the pace with a string of quick laps, and came out five seconds ahead. Ralf cruised to victory, with his brother making it the first time ever that brothers have finished 1–2 in a race, and Häkkinen finished third, his first podium of the season. Coulthard was set for third but retired when his engine failed 15 laps from the finish.

With nearly half the season complete, Schumacher had 58 points and leads Coulthard by 18 points, mostly courtesy of the seventh and eighth rounds. Coulthard had a further 16 points over Barrichello who had 24 points, and 18 over Ralf, who had 22. Häkkinen was fifth with 8. In the Constructors' Championship, Ferrari with 82 points had a huge lead over McLaren, who had 48. Williams was third with 28.

The next race, the European Grand Prix was again all about the Schumacher brothers, and Michael took his seventh pole of the season, ahead of his brother. The brothers maintained their positions at the start, and Ralf was able to keep up in second during the first stint. However, he passed the white line after his first stop and received a stop-go penalty which dropped him out of contention. This left Michael Schumacher to cruise to another victory, with Montoya in second, and Coulthard third. Ralf, even with his penalty was able to get fourth ahead of Barrichello and Häkkinen.

In the French Grand Prix, the Schumacher brothers started 1–2 again, but it was Ralf who took pole, his first-ever career pole. Ralf maintained his lead at the start but his brother jumped him at the first round of stops and then pulled away. Coulthard, who had started third was in contention until he went over the white line while coming out of the pit lane and received a stop-go penalty. Montoya was running quickly and could have challenged his teammate for a second had his engine not blown up. Schumacher won comfortably from brother Ralf, with Barrichello holding off Coulthard for third.

Schumacher took pole for the British GP and maintained his position at the first corner, but Häkkinen, who was on a two-stopper passed him on the fifth lap. Häkkinen never looked back and dominated to take his first win of the year. Schumacher, whose one-stop strategy didn't work out well, was over half a minute back in second, and Barrichello completed the podium.

The weekend of the German GP was dominated by the Williams team, and their drivers locked out the front row, and Montoya took his first career pole. Montoya converted his pole to a lead at the start and was looking well set to win until his engine blew up. This left Ralf to cruise to victory, and Barrichello took second and Jacques Villeneuve got his second podium of the season in third, both capitalising on Schumacher's retirement with a fuel pressure problem, and both McLarens retiring with engine failures.

Schumacher now had no less than 84 points, and it seemed inevitable that he would win the championship. A win in the next round in Hungary would be enough. Coulthard was a distant second with 47 and was looking anxiously over his shoulders, as Ralf with 41 and Barrichello with 37 were hot on his heels. Häkkinen and Montoya were fifth and sixth with 19 and 15 points respectively. In the Constructors' Championship, Ferrari led with 121 compared to McLaren's 66, and a 1–2 in Hungary would wrap up the title. Williams were third with 56, within touching distance of McLaren.

Schumacher took another step to winning the title by taking pole in the Hungarian GP, ahead of Coulthard and Barrichello. Schumacher kept first at the start, but Coulthard was passed by Barrichello. Schumacher pulled away, while Barrichello kept Coulthard at bay. Coulthard jumped Barrichello at the first round of stops, only for the Brazilian to return the favour at the second. Schumacher won the race and the championship, and Barrichello made it a Ferrari 1–2 which gave Ferrari the Constructors' Championship. A disappointed Coulthard finished third.

The two Williams cars of Montoya and Ralf qualified 1–2 for the Belgian GP, but that soon came to nothing for the former when he stalled on the grid and started at the back. Ralf was quickly passed by world champion Michael Schumacher into the first corner. After a few laps, there was a collision between Eddie Irvine and Luciano Burti, and the latter ran head-on into the tyres. The race was stopped, while Burti was treated for his injuries. While the injuries were not serious, Burti was never to race in F1 again. A new race, shortened to 36 laps was started, and the top 3 in the new grid were: Michael Schumacher, his brother Ralf and Barrichello. Ralf's car was on its jacks when the warmup started, and he too had to start at the back. Michael kept first at the start, and pulled away, while Barrichello lost out to Giancarlo Fisichella. Barrichello lost further time when he ran over a bollard at the Bus Stop chicane and damaging his front wing, and he had to around for an entire lap before pitting to change the wing. This left the two McLarens behind Fisichella. Coulthard was able to pass him with 10 laps left. Schumacher took his 52nd career win, breaking Alain Prost's record of most wins ever, with Coulthard and a superb Fisichella completing the podium.

The next round was in Italy, the first race after the September 11 attacks, and before the race, Michael Schumacher wanted all the drivers to go slowly at the first corner, due to 9/11, and a horrific accident in ChampCar the day before in which former F1 driver Alessandro Zanardi suffered serious injuries but this plan did not work out because Jacques Villeneuve and Benetton boss Flavio Briatore did not accept it. The Ferrari team ran without sponsors' logos in deference to sponsor Philip Morris and a black tip on their nose, as respect for 9/11. Montoya took pole, ahead of the two Ferraris of Barrichello and Schumacher. The top 3 maintained their positions at the start, but Montoya was soon passed by a two-stopping Barrichello. Montoya and Barrichello battled it out with different plans, and Montoya came out on top after Barrichello suffered problems during his first stop which cost him 7 seconds. A jubilant Montoya took his first career win, with Barrichello and Ralf second and third.

The US GP was the host of the penultimate round, and Schumacher took pole ahead of his brother and Montoya. Schumacher led into the first corner, while Ralf lost out to both Montoya and Barrichello. A two-stopping Barrichello soon took the lead and pitted. Montoya passes Schumacher before the round of stops, but retired two laps after his stop when his engine failed. With everyone stopping once, Barrichello was leading from Häkkinen, Schumacher, and Coulthard. Barrichello rejoined second behind Häkkinen after his stop and started to close in until his engine failed on the penultimate lap. Häkkinen took a superb win (which turned out to be his last), and Barrichello's demise left Schumacher and Coulthard to take second and third.

Going into the final race, this was the championship standings: Schumacher the champion with 113 points, Coulthard second with 61, Barrichello third with 54, Ralf fourth with 48, Häkkinen fifth with 34, and Montoya sixth with 25. In the Constructors' Championship, Ferrari was a winner with 167 points, McLaren with 95 was confirmed in second, and Williams with 73 was confirmed in third.

The last round was in Japan, and Schumacher took pole again, ahead of Montoya and Ralf. The top 3 kept their places into the first corner, even though Ralf was soon passed by a three-stopping Barrichello. Barrichello was unable to pass Montoya, and this ruined his strategy. Ralf was given a stop-go penalty for cutting the chicane at the last corner too frequently. This left Häkkinen running third in his last race in F1, but he gave the position to teammate Coulthard as a token of gratitude for all the support Coulthard gave him during the previous seasons. Schumacher capped off the season with a victory ahead of Montoya and Coulthard. Häkkinen was fourth in his last ever race, ahead of Barrichello and Ralf.

At the end of the season, Schumacher was a dominant champion with 123 points. Coulthard with 65 was a distant second, 58 points behind. Barrichello was third with 56, Ralf fourth with 49, Häkkinen fifth with 37, and Montoya sixth with 31. This meant that Schumacher had collected more than second and third-placed drivers' (Coulthard's and Barichello's) totals put together. In the Constructors' Championship, Ferrari was a winner with 179 points, a massive 77 ahead of second-placed McLaren with 102, and Williams was third with 80 points.

Results and standings

Grands Prix

Scoring system

Points were awarded to the top six finishers in each race as follows:

World Drivers' Championship standingsNotes: – Driver did not finish the Grand Prix but was classified, as he completed more than 90% of the race distance.

World Constructors' Championship standingsNotes:'''
 – Driver did not finish the Grand Prix but was classified, as he completed more than 90% of the race distance.

Notes

References

External links

formula1.com – 2001 official driver standings (archived)
formula1.com – 2001 official team standings (archived)
2001 Formula One Sporting Regulations Retrieved from web.archive.org on 23 January 2009
2001 Formula One Technical Regulations Retrieved from web.archive.org on 25 January 2009
2001 FIA Formula One World Championship for Drivers – Final Classification Retrieved from web.archive.org on 25 January 2009
 2001 FIA Formula One World Championship for Constructors – Final Classification Retrieved from web.archive.org on 25 January 2009
2001 FIA Formula One World Championship images, www.f1-photo.com

Formula One seasons
2001 in Formula One
Formula 1